The Bureau of South and Central Asian Affairs (SCA) is an agency within the United States Department of State that is responsible for the U.S. government's relations with countries in the South and Central Asian region. The bureau is headed by the Assistant Secretary of State for South and Central Asian Affairs, who reports to the Secretary of State through the Under Secretary of State for Political Affairs. The current Assistant Secretary is Donald Lu, incumbent since September 15, 2021.

History

After six years of trying, Congress allocated the funds to create an independent Bureau of South Asian Affairs in 1991. Pursuant to the Foreign Relations Authorization Act for Fiscal Years 1992 and 1993, the Bureau of South Asian Affairs was established on August 24, 1992,  after having been a part of the Bureau of Near Eastern and South Asian Affairs since 1958. In February 2006 the bureau absorbed the Office of Central Asian Affairs from the Bureau of European and Eurasian Affairs.

Organization
The offices of the Bureau of South and Central Asian Affairs direct, coordinate, and supervise U.S. government activities within the region, including political, economic, consular, public diplomacy, and administrative management issues.

SCA Front Office – The office of the Assistant Secretary and other principals in the bureau
Office of India, Nepal, Sri Lanka, Bangladesh, Bhutan, and Maldives Affairs – Informs policy and coordinates with U.S. Missions in India, Nepal, Sri Lanka, Bangladesh, Bhutan, and the Maldives
Office of Pakistan Affairs – Oversees Pakistan–United States relations, and liaises with the U.S. Embassy in Pakistan
Office of Central Asian Affairs – Informs policy and coordinates with U.S. Missions in Kazakhstan, Kyrgyzstan, Tajikistan, Turkmenistan, and Uzbekistan
Office of Security and Transnational Affairs
Office of Press and Public Diplomacy – Coordinates public outreach and digital engagement, and prepares press guidance for the Department Spokesperson in the Bureau of Public Affairs
Office of Afghanistan Affairs – Oversees Afghanistan–United States relations, and liaises with the U.S. Embassy in Afghanistan

References

External links

SCA
United States diplomacy
United States–Asian relations
Afghanistan–United States relations
Bangladesh–United States relations
India–United States relations
Kazakhstan–United States relations
Kyrgyzstan–United States relations
Nepal–United States relations
Maldives–United States relations
Pakistan–United States relations
Sri Lanka–United States relations
Tajikistan–United States relations
Turkmenistan–United States relations
United States–Uzbekistan relations
Government agencies established in 2006
2006 establishments in Washington, D.C.